The 2012 NextEra Energy Resources 250 the 1st race of the 2012 NASCAR Camping World Truck Series and the 13th annual running of this event. The event was held on Saturday, February 24, 2012, at Daytona International Speedway in Daytona Beach, Florida. The event featured a surprise winner as John King won his first and only win in his NASCAR career as this race became known as a wreckfest.

Entry list
(R) denotes rookie driver
(i) denotes driver who is ineligible for series driver points

Qualifying
Miguel Paludo won the pole for the event with a time of 49.583 and a speed of 181.514 mph. Surprisingly, all 3 of the Turner Motorsports trucks qualified in the top 3 with Paludo winning the pole, Nelson Piquet Jr. in second, and James Buescher in third

* – David Starr and Parker Kligerman had to start at the rear of the field. Starr pitted before the green flag and Kligerman had adjustments outside impound

** – Ryan Sieg originally qualified 37th, T. J. Duke originally qualified 39th, and Chris Cockrum originally qualified in 44th. All 3 still made the field via Owners Points.

Race
Pole sitter Miguel Paludo led the first lap and the first 20 laps of the race. The first caution flew on lap 18 for a 4 truck crash off of turn 4. The pack caught up to a slow truck in Chris Cockrum and Cockrum went to the bottom of the track so everyone else could pass him on the high side. Rookie Paulie Harraka got loose off of 4 and spun into Cockrum and went back up the race track into Jason Leffler pinning Leffler into the wall. Daokda Armstrong also spun trying the avoid the crash. Miguel Paludo won the race off of pit road to keep his race lead. After the longest green flag run of 19 laps, the second caution flew on lap 42 for debris on the race track. Paludo once again won the race off of pit road to keep his lead. On the restart, Paludo's teammate James Buescher passed him to take the lead. On lap 50, the third caution flew for  a piece of debris that came off of rookie Dakoda Armstrong's truck. On the restart on lap 55, Paludo took the lead from Buescher with a push by Brad Keselowski. On lap 62, the fourth caution flew for a 5 truck accident in the tri-oval after John King made contact with Cale Gale turning Gale around and collecting T. J Duke, Mike Skinner, and Matt Crafton. James Buescher was the new race leader. On the restart with 32 to go, Nelson Piquet Jr. took the lead from Buescher.

Final laps
With 17 laps to go, James White attempted to pass Piquet Jr. for the lead. On the same lap out of turn 4, one of the hardest and scariest crashes in NASCAR history occurred bringing out the 5th caution. Out of turn 4, Miguel Paludo was running right behind Piquet when he lost control of his truck. His truck turned left and smashed into the inside wall head on at nearly full speed. The impact along with the SAFER barrier flexing in and shooting Paludo's truck back out made his truck fly through the air and spin it around like a top even catching fire. Paludo's crash was eerily similar to Danica Patrick's crash on the last lap of the Daytona 500 Duel race the previous day except Patrick hit the inside wall on the backstretch instead of the frontstretch. Fortunatley, Paludo walked away from the crash uninjured as crews checked the SAFER barrier where Paludo hit. Jason White got out in front of Nelson Piquet Jr. when the caution flew which made him the leader of the race. On the restart with 10 to go, Jason White held onto his lead from Piquet. White was able to hold off a charge for the lead by James Buescher with 8 laps to go. But on the next lap with 7 to go, the 6th caution flew for a 5 truck crash in turn 4. Parker Kligerman and David Starr both had a run racing side by side with each other in a 3 wide pack. Dusty Davis, who was on the top lane, tried to come down in front of either Kligerman or Starr but turned down late and ended up squeezing Kligerman in between him and Starr. Both Kligerman and Starr both spun off of turn 4 collecting rookies Ross Chastain and Bryan Silas. As a result, the race would have three attempts of a green-white-checker finish. On the first attempt, Johnny Sauter took the lead from James White with a big push by Ron Hornaday. But in turn 4, the first big one would occur taking out 7 trucks and bringing out the 7th caution. Brad Keselowski got bumped from behind by Clay Greenfield and spun out collecting Ty Dillon, Dusty Davis, Max Gresham, Ryan Sieg, and Rick Crawford. On the second attempt, Sauter kept the lead with John King right behind him. It looked like Sauter was gonna be able to hold off everyone and take the win. But coming to the white flag, King turned Sauter before they reached the tri-oval triggering an 11 truck crash and bringing out the 8th caution just before the white flag flew. The trucks involved were Sauter, King, David Starr, Brendan Gaughan, Grant Enfinger, Matt Crafton, Nelson Piquet Jr., Parker Kligerman, Chris Fontaine, Ryan Sieg, and Ty Dillon. The race was red flagged for a short period to clean up the mess from the wreck in the tri-oval. As soon as the red flag was lifted, John King was the new race leader. King also looked like he was gonna have help to get the win since King's teammates at Red Horse Racing in Todd Bodine and Timothy Peters were gonna restart in 2nd and 3rd. On the restart, King got out in front with a push by Peters. Todd Bodine, meanwhile, fell back on the restart going back from 2nd to battling for the top 10 with Joey Coulter trying to push Bodine to get him up to speed. John King took the white flag as the leader. As soon as the trucks took the white flag, James Buescher got turned by Dusty Davis in the tri-oval. Buescher turned left into Joey Coulter's right rear. Coulter hit the outside wall, caught air, got hit again by Buescher, and hit the catch fence with the rear of the truck spinning around and landing on his wheels. The wreck also collected Ron Hornaday. This brought out the 9th and final caution of the race. John King was out in front when the caution flew and King scored his first and only NASCAR win of his entire career. Coutler walked away uninjured from the crash while 2 spectators were injured by debris that came out of Coulter's truck and went through the catchfence. Thankfully, there were no deaths and the catchfence got repaired in time for the Nationwide Series race the following day. Timothy Peters, Justin Lofton, Travis Kvapil, and Jason White rounded out the top 5 while Todd Bodine, Chris Fontaine, Ward Burton, Ty Dillon, and Clay Greenfield rounded out the top 10.

Race results

References

 2012 in sports in Florida
 NASCAR races at Daytona International Speedway
 February 2012 sports events in the United States